The Huntington Union - Free School District is a school district in Huntington, New York. There are eight schools in the district. Students in kindergarten through grade 3 are situated at Flower Hill Primary, Jefferson Primary, Southdown Primary and Washington Primary Schools. The Jack Abrams STEM Magnet School includes students in grades 4–6 from throughout the district. Woodhull Intermediate School houses students in grades 4, 5 and 6.  J. Taylor Finley Middle School serves students in grades 7 and 8. Huntington High School serves students in grades 9 through 12.

The district is known for its diverse population and its broad-ranging academic and extracurricular programs, including widely recognized programs in the arts and athletics.  The district has greatly expanded its STEM initiatives during the past few years, including the STEM Magnet School program and a middle school STEM enrichment program.  The district also features an expanding and inclusive science research program at Huntington High School, which produced a Intel Science Talent Search winner in 2014. The elementary dual-language program is another popular option for elementary parents and students.

References

External links
 Public Schools website

Education in Suffolk County, New York
School districts in New York (state)
1657 establishments in the Dutch Empire